Ornela Vištica (born 18 September 1989) is a Herzegovinian Croat actress and model.

Filmography

Television roles

References

External links

1989 births
Living people
Croats of Bosnia and Herzegovina
21st-century Bosnia and Herzegovina actresses
Bosnia and Herzegovina television actresses
Bosnia and Herzegovina female models
Actors from Mostar